Minzhi station is on Line 5 of the Shenzhen Metro. It opened on 22 June 2011.

Station layout

Exits

References

External links
 Shenzhen Metro Minzhi Station (Chinese)
 Shenzhen Metro Minzhi Station (English)

Shenzhen Metro stations
Railway stations in Guangdong
Longhua District, Shenzhen
Railway stations in China opened in 2011